This is a list of Azerbaijan football transfers in the winter transfer window 2013 by club. Only clubs of the 2012–13 Azerbaijan Premier League are included.

Azerbaijan Premier League 2012–13

AZAL Baku

In:

Out:

Baku

In:

Out:

Gabala

In:

 
 

 

Out:

Inter Baku

In:

 

Out:

Kəpəz

In:

Out:

Khazar Lankaran

In:

 

 
 

 

Out:

Neftchi Baku

In:

 

Out:

Qarabağ

In:

 
 

Out:

Ravan Baku

In:

Out:

Simurq

In:

Out:

Sumgayit

In:

Out:

Turan

In:

Out:

References

External links
Transfer List

Azerbaijan
Azerbaijani football transfer lists